The 2019–20 season will be C.D. Marathón's 69th season in existence and the club's 54rd consecutive season in the top fight of Honduran football. The club will fight for its 10th league title, facing also the 2019 Honduran Cup, the 2019 Honduran Supercup, and the 2019 CONCACAF League.

Overview
Héctor Vargas remains as the manager; he has been in charge since the 2017–18 season.

Apertura

Transfers in

Transfers out

Loans out

Standings

Matches

Results by round

Regular season

CONCACAF League

Preliminary Round 

Comunicaciones won 3–2 on aggregate.

References

C.D. Marathón seasons
Honduran football clubs 2019–20 season